Rebuilt is the second and final studio album by the American girl group Girlicious. The album was released on November 22, 2010, by Universal Music Canada. The album draws from the dance-pop genre while infusing hints of R&B. Production initially started in 2009, after former member Tiffanie Anderson parted citing personal differences between the girls.

The album has sparked four singles and one promotional single; The first being, "Over You" which was released on January 5, 2010. The song reached number fifty-two on the Canadian Hot 100. "Maniac" was released on April 6, 2010 as the album's second single. The song peaked lower than its previous single reaching number seventy-four. "Drank" was released on July 20, 2010 to Canada and to the United States as a promotional song for "Rebuilt" as well as being included on Jersey Shores album soundtrack. The album's third single entitled "2 In The Morning" reached a peak of thirty-five giving the group their highest-charting single since "Stupid Shit". "Hate Love" was released on February 21, 2011 to Canadian radio stations as the group's fourth and final single from the album.

Rebuilt was the only album released following the departure of group member Tiffanie Anderson, and was the last album released with group members Chrystina Sayers, Nichole Cordova, and Natalie Mejia, and the last to be released by the group itself.

Background
After the departure of Tiffanie Anderson in mid 2009, the group began working on their follow up album after switching from Geffen Records to Universal Music Canada. The album features more of a dance-pop genre while still incorporating hints of R&B. The group explained that they chose to switch genres so that their music would more accurately reflect their musical tastes as well as themselves. During the writing of the album, the girls had a bigger hand this time around explaining, "We got a bigger hand in the creative aspect of this album than the first one. [...] There wasn't a person in the room saying, 'this is what we need it to be.' We got to pick the parts we want to sing [...] the album will reflect more of who we are."

Singles
"Over You" was released as the album's first single and was sent to Canadian radio on December 25, 2009. It was released to Canadian iTunes on January 5, 2010. The single reached number fifty-two on the Canadian Hot 100.

"Maniac" was released as the second single on April 6, 2010. The song charted at number seventy-four on the Canadian Hot 100. The song charted on the Serbian Top 50 singles, where it was listed for eleven weeks and reached a peak of eleven. The accompanying music video premiered on May 4, 2010. The girls were featured in a special "On Set" with Much Music where the video initially premiered.

"Drank" was released on July 20, 2010 to digital retailers in Canada and the United States. It was released as a promotional single from Rebuilt and is featured as the 11 track on the iTunes Deluxe Edition. The single version features a guest rap verse by artist Spose. The song was also featured on the Jersey Shore Soundtrack album without the Spose verse.

"2 in the Morning" was released as the album's third single on August 31, 2010. The song reached a peak of thirty-five on the Canadian Hot 100 becoming their highest charting song since "Stupid Shit". It contains a sample of "Pesenka" performed by Russian band Ruki Vverh!. The single was also released in the United States on August 31, 2010. A "2 In the Morning (Harper & Brother Mix)" remix version of the song was released in Canada on January 11, 2011.

"Hate Love" was released as the album's fourth and final single on February 21, 2011. The song debuted at number 44 on the Canadian Airplay Chart on the week of March 14, 2011, and later peaked at number 26 on the chart. On the week of April 2, 2011, the song finally debuted on the Canadian Hot 100 at number 97. The song reached a peak of 59.

Track listing

Notes
 "2 in the Morning" contains a sample of a Russian band Ruki Vverh! in a song Pesenka

Lead Vocals
 Track 1 - Chrystina & Nichole
 Track 2 - Chrystina, Nichole & Natalie
 Track 3 - Nichole, Chrystina & Natalie 
 Track 4 - Natalie, Nichole & Chrystina
 Track 5 - Chrystina, Natalie & Nichole
 Track 6 - Natalie, Chrystina & Nichole
 Track 7 - Nichole & Chrystina
 Track 8 - Chrystina, Nichole & Natalie
 Track 9 - Chrystina, Nichole & Natalie
 Track 10 - Chrystina, Nichole & Natalie
 Track 11 - Natalie, Chrystina & Nichole
 Track 12 - Nichole, Chrystina & Natalie 
 Track 13 - Nichole, Natalie & Chrystina

Charts

Release history

References

2010 albums
Girlicious albums
Universal Music Canada albums